The Independent Democratic Party of Serbia was a conservative political party in Serbia.

The Samostalni DSS was formed in 2015 via a split in the Democratic Party of Serbia (Demokratska stranka Srbije, DSS). Its leader was Andreja Mladenović, who was elected to the National Assembly of Serbia in the 2016 Serbian parliamentary election as a Samostalni DSS candidate on the electoral list of the governing Serbian Progressive Party.

History
The DSS won nine seats (out of 110) in the 2014 Belgrade City Assembly election, and Mladenović served as leader of the party's delegation to the Assembly of the City of Belgrade. The Serbian Progressive Party won an outright majority in this election, and, when the assembly met, new Progressive mayor Siniša Mali nominated Mladenović to become the city's deputy mayor. He was confirmed in this role by a vote of the assembly.

In July 2015, DSS leader Sanda Rašković Ivić expelled Mladenović and six other members of the party's Belgrade assembly group on the grounds that they were attempting to turn the DSS into a satellite of the Progressive Party. The expelled members described this decision as unjust and contrary to party policy and established the Samostalni DSS with Mladenović as their leader. The group initially identified as a fraction within the DSS and said they would work for the party's renewal. The Samostalni DSS later became a distinct party, and Mladenović was formally chosen as its leader at a founding convention in October 2015. Branches were established in several municipalities, and Samostalni DSS members served in some municipal assemblies.

Mladenović sought to establish an alliance between the Samostalni DSS and the Progressive Party in early 2016. He was included in the tenth position on the Progressive Party's coalition electoral list for the 2016 Serbian parliamentary election and was elected when the list won a majority victory with 131 out of 250 mandates. His term in this office was brief; he could not hold a dual mandate as both a member of the National Assembly and deputy mayor of Belgrade, and he resigned his assembly seat on 3 October 2016. He was the Samostalni DSS's sole representative in the National Assembly during this time and appears to have been its only candidate on the Progressive list; his replacement in the assembly was Progressive Mladen Lukić.

The Samostalni DSS appears to have become inactive in 2017. Mladenović was re-elected to the Belgrade assembly in the 2018 Belgrade City Assembly election with the endorsement of the Progressive Party. In November of 2019 Samostalni DSS merged with Movement for development of Serbia to form the Independent Party of Serbia.

References

2015 establishments in Serbia
2017 disestablishments in Serbia
Conservative parties in Serbia
Defunct conservative parties
Defunct political parties in Serbia
Political parties disestablished in 2017
Political parties established in 2015